Parnevik is a surname. Notable people with the surname include:

 Bosse Parnevik (born 1938), Swedish impersonator, revue artist, and comedian
 Jesper Parnevik (born 1965), Swedish golfer
 Peg Parnevik (born 1995), Swedish singer, songwriter, and television personality

See also
 Parneviks